Haitham Mattar is a Lebanese-American business executive and former CEO of the Ras Al Khaimah Tourism Development Authority.

where he successfully repositioned Ras Al Khaimah to become one of the fastest growing destinations in the world, exceeding the target of one million visitors in the first three years and winning a number of global travel awards and personal accolades.

Mattar’s cross-continent experience and valuable global insights allowed him to effectively lead Ras Al Khaimah’s destination growth strategy, through capturing existing and emerging source market movements and international tourism trends.  He was also instrumental in the concept and delivery of globally recognized tourism demand generators in the emirate including Jebel Jais Flight: the world’s longest zipline and the region’s first Via Ferrata.

Mattar, now Sr. Advisor to the Saudi Ministry of Tourism, advising on developing and implementing  Saudi’s tourism strategy, applying his expertise in the development of source markets, routes, product and overall destination development.

In April 2021, Mattar was appointed as the Managing Director of MD of India, Middle East & Africa by IHG Hotels & Resorts.

Career
Mattar is slated to take over the role of Managing Director of India, Middle East & Africa (IMEA) for IHG Hotels & Resorts, effective April 18, 2021.

Since starting his career in hospitality in 1987, Mattar has held senior roles with global hotel brands, including Marriott, InterContinental Hotels Group (IHG) and Hilton Worldwide.

In 2005, Mattar assumed the role of Director of Sales and Marketing at InterContinental Hotels Group, where he was responsible for the sales & marketing functions at properties in the Middle East and Africa region. In 2009, he was appointed as Area General Manager - Lebanon & Commercial Director Near East, overseeing the operational & commercial functions for IHG's hotels in Lebanon, Libya, Egypt, Jordan and Syria.

As Regional Vice President of Marketing and Sales for Hilton, Mattar was responsible for the development of source markets, Global and National Sales & Marketing offices as well as the development and implementation of Marketing & Sales strategy of over 130 properties across the Middle East, Africa, Eastern Europe, Turkey and Russia.

As CEO of the Ras Al Khaimah Tourism Development Authority, Mattar was responsible for Ras Al Khaimah's brand positioning, destination marketing, tourism development and growth strategy. During the time Mattar has assumed the role of CEO, Ras Al Khaimah has recorded rapid economic progress and unprecedented growth in tourism figures.

Education
A Lebanese-born American citizen and Arabic speaker, Mattar holds an MBA in marketing from the University of Liverpool, United Kingdom.

Named ‘Tourism Promotion CEO of the Year’ at the Global CEO Excellence Awards, Mattar was featured in the Arabian Business ‘most powerful Arabs’ list, in addition to being named one of the top 100 smartest people in the UAE. Also names ‘Leisure and Tourism CEO of the Year’ at the prestigious CEO Middle East Awards and ‘Business Leader of the Year’ at the Hozpitality Excellence Awards in 2018. 

In 2017, Mattar was elected as Vice Chair of the UNWTO Board of Affiliate Members as well as being appointed as a member of the steering committee for the UNWTO 2017 International Year for Sustainable Development in Tourism. Mattar was also named a full-time advisory board member of the Global Thinkers Forum (GTF) in 2018, and an Advisory Board Member of Al Marjan Development. Mattar is also a member of the Steering Committee of the Ras Al Khaimah Department of Economy and was appointed in 2018 as a member of the Arabian Travel Market Advisory Board by Reed Travel Exhibitions. In August 2018 Ras Al Khaimah Tourism Development Authority joined WTTC as a member, being represented by Mattar.

References

American people of Lebanese descent
Living people
American chief executives of travel and tourism industry companies
Alumni of the University of Liverpool
Year of birth missing (living people)